Suarezia is a monotypic genus of flowering plants from the orchid family, Orchidaceae. The sole species is Suarezia ecuadorana, endemic to Ecuador and classified as vulnerable.

See also 
 List of Orchidaceae genera

References

External links 

Oncidiinae
Orchids of Ecuador